Jaroslav Melnik (Yaroslav Melnyk , ; born 6  February 1959) is a Ukrainian/Lithuanian novelist, philosopher, and critic.

Life 

Born in West Ukraine, J.Melnik is graduated from Lviv University and did his postgraduate studies at Maxim Gorky Literature Institute in Moscow. He worked as a magazine writer for Elle (magazine). 
In 1997, the novel Les Parias d’Eden (The Pariahs of Eden) was published by Robert Laffont Publishers in Paris. It received accolades from France’s literary critics and was praised by the country’s press.

His dystopian novel " Remote space " (BBC Book of the Year 2013) published in France in 2017, also had real success (Prize Libr'a Nous 2018, Best book of the Year).

Critics call him a mystic and existential writer. 

His work is in the compulsory curriculum of secondary schools in Ukraine.

He lives between Lithuania and France.

Career 

J.Melnik was a well known critic in Ukraine before moving to Lithuania and becoming a Lithuanian writer of Ukrainian descent. However, he has in 2012 enjoyed a literary return to Ukraine and Ukrainian.

He's a winner of numerous competitions and awards, author of more than ten books which have been published in European countries.

Melnik's books have been among the best Lithuanian and Ukrainian books of the year a number of times. The End of the World, Distant Space and Masha, Or Post-fascism were all listed in the Top Five Lithuanian Books for their year of publication, and Kelias į rojų (The Road to Paradise) was included in the Top Twelve Most Creative Lithuanian Books in 2010 and have been nominated for Europe Book Prize.
His book The Paris Diary (2013) became a bestseller in Lithuania.

Melnik's dystopian novel "Remote Space" (Distant space) won BBC Book of the Year in 2013. It was published in French in 2017 as Espace lointain (Agullo editions, translated from Lithuanian). 
The novel was awarded a prize for the Book of the Year in France  (LIBR'A NOUS 2018, the Imaginary category : 250 bookstores of Francophone countries elected a long list, then a shortlist and finally a winner. Choice of 400 novels). Espace Lointain is being reissued in pocket-sized format in 2018 (ed. Le Livre de Poche).

His dystopian novel Masha, or the Fourth Reich (published in Lithuanian as ‘Maša, arba Postfašizmas’) is shortlisted for “Books of the Year 2014”. 
In 2016 it was published in Ukraine (shortlisted for the BBC Book Of The Year 2016), and became a bestseller. "In  a futuristic novel with a sharp plot titled “Masha, or the Fourth Reich”, which was described by critics as a “shocking work about Nazis and intense love”, the author develops anti-utopian genre and analyzes the sins of humanity" (Planet News review). In 2020, the novel was published in France by Actes Sud.

In 2019, the "Scandinavian" detective Adata Needle by J. Melnik was released, in which the investigation of an unusual sexual crime is accompanied by penetration into the depths of the human psyche. The novel raises the problem of religious sects and Freudian complexes.
he book has received a number of nominations.

His work is characterized by its constructivist and philosophical approach, by existential problems and intriguing combinations of science fiction and realism. This is typical for the book Rojalio kambarys (The Grand Piano Room - Last Day).

Critics call him “a Neo-Symbolist of Lithuanian literature”
   
"Yaroslav Melnyk is the most cosmopolitan Ukrainian writer of the 21st century"
(British library, London)

All of his books in Ukrainian prose were finalist's books of the “BBC Ukrainian Book of the Year” (2012, 2013, 2014, 2016).

Press 

A real success (Télérama)

An initiatory novel with dull melancholy (Le Monde)

A very cinematic writing (Le Point)

To read with your eyes closed! (Canard enchainé)

Halfway between Tarkovsky and Saramago (Addict-Culture)

Why deprive yourself of such a jewel? (20 minutes)

Jaroslavas Melnikas questions with great accuracy the taboos that limit human freedom (Lire)

He meditates, like Dostoyevsky, on the relations of sin with freedom (La Croix)

We return to the fundamentals of the SF, those of Poul Anderson, Clifford Simak, Brian Aldiss or Isaac Asimov ... It was a while that the SF did not deliver a work of this level (La Cause Littéraire)

Books 

 Freedom, or Sin (Laisvė ar nuodėmė): philosophical essays. Vilnius: Petro ofsetas, 1996.
 The Pariahs of Eden (Les Parias d’Eden): novel. Paris: Robert Laffont, 1997.
 The Grand Piano Room (Rojalio kambarys): long and short stories. Vilnius: Lithuanian Writers' Union publishers, 2004
 The End of the World (Pasaulio pabaiga): long and short stories. Vilnius: Lithuanian Writers' Union publishers, 2006
 A Very Strange House (Labai keistas namas): 88 novels: philosophical miniatures. Vilnius: Lithuanian Writers' Union publishers, 2008
 Remote space (Tolima erdvė, in Lithuanian): novel. Vilnius: Lithuanian Writers' Union publishers, 2008
 The Road to Paradise (Kelias į rojų): surrealistic novel, long and short stories. Vilnius: Baltos lankos, 2010. 
 Phone me, talk to me (Телефонуй мені, говори зі мною): novel, long and short stories. Kiev: Tempora, 2012.
 The Paris Diary (Paryžiaus dienoraštis): essays. Vilnius: Alma littera, 2013
 Remote Space (Далекий простір, in Ukrainian): novel. Charkiv: Family Leisure Club, 2013 
 Masha, or Post-fascism (Maša, arba Postfašizmas, in Lithuanian): novel. Vilnius: Alma littera, 2013
 Why I Do Not Get Tired of Living (Чому я не втомлююся жити): long and short stories. Charkiv: Family Leisure Club, 2014
 Anorexia (Anoreksija): 22 short stories. Vilnius: Alma littera, 2013
 Masha, or Post-fascism (Маша, або постфашизм, in Ukrainian): novel. Lviv: The Old Lion Publishing House, 2016
 Lords of heaven: novel. Vilnius: Alma littera, 2016
 Remote space (Espace lointain, in French): novel. Paris: Agullo editions, 2017
 Last day  (in English, translated from Lithuanian): Noir Press, 2018
 Remote space (Espace lointain, in French, Pocket Edition): novel. Paris: Livre de Poche, 2018
 Masha, or Post-fascism (Macha ou le IV Reich, in French, Actes Sud), 2020
 Remote space (Der weite Raum, in German, Klak Publishing House): novel. Berlin: 2020

References

External links 
 BBC Book of the Year
 Transcript
 CONSTRUCTIVE ILLOGICALITY OR POSTMODERN ALLEGORIES. About Melnik's prose
 British library
 Yaroslav Melnyk’s Science Fiction Novels
 Relating Daily Routine to Eternity

1959 births
Living people
Lithuanian novelists
Ukrainian writers
Ukrainian novelists
Maxim Gorky Literature Institute alumni